Haryana Space Applications Centre, Hisar (HARSAC), a collaborator of ISRO, is a nodal agency for Remote Sensing and GIS applications of the Government of Haryana. It is located next to Centre for Plant Biotechnology (PCB) within the CCS Haryana Agricultural University, Hisar in the Haryana state of India. It provides various remote sensing applications such as in monitoring illegal constructions and encroachments, stubble burning and pollution monitoring, and revival of Saraswati river.

It also offers M.Tech degree in association with GJU Hisar University.

Controversies
In 2016, environmental activists accused unknown HARSAC scientist for allegedly helping builders in encroaching upon a part of a 27 km long seasonal rivulet in Gurugram, subsequently a departmental inquiry was conducted by the Director of the HARSAC. Another complaint is pending before the Haryana Lokayukta against the HARSAC for allegedly providing favourable reports to the financial interests of unauthorised colonisers.

See also

Lists
 List of universities and colleges in Hisar
 List of Indian satellites
 List of foreign satellites launched by India
 List of ISRO missions
 List of government space agencies
 Index of aerospace engineering articles

Topics
 Timeline of Solar System exploration

Organisations
 Department of Space
 Indian Institute of Remote Sensing
 Indian Institute of Space Science and Technology
 National Remote Sensing Centre
 Space Research and Remote Sensing Organization

External links
 Haryana Space Application Centre (HrDSI)
 Space Application Maps of Haryana, produced by Haryana Space Application Centre.
 Canal network of Haryana, based on water from Western Yamuna Canal.
 Multi-model transport network map of Haryana, created by HARSAC.
 Railway network of Haryana, created by HARSAC.

References 

Universities and colleges in Hisar (city)
Research institutes in Hisar (city)
Science and technology in Haryana
Educational institutions in India with year of establishment missing